Frederick Jolley Sheffield (November 5, 1923 – December 8, 2009) was an American basketball player.  He won an NCAA championship with the University of Utah in 1944 and played one season for the Philadelphia Warriors in the Basketball Association of America (BAA).

Sheffield, a 6'2 forward and center, played for Utah and, as a sophomore, was a member of the Utes' 1944 national championship team.  While many college athletes were called to serve for the military during World War II, Sheffield had a deferment as a pre-medicine major.  Also an accomplished track athlete, Sheffield was also the men's collegiate champion in the high jump in 1943 and 1945 and the national champion in 1943.

After the conclusion of his collegiate career, Sheffield played for the Philadelphia Warriors in the BAA for the 1946–47 season. Sheffield averaged 3.4 points in 22 games in a reserve role, but was cut by the team before the Warriors went on to win the inaugural BAA championship.  Sheffield became a doctor, practicing for most of his adult life.  Sheffield died on December 8, 2009.

BAA career statistics

Regular season

References

1923 births
2009 deaths
American men's basketball players
Basketball players from Utah
Forwards (basketball)
Philadelphia Warriors players
Sunbury Mercuries players
Utah Utes men's basketball players
People from Kaysville, Utah